The Australian Eight Ball Federation (or Eight Ball Federation Incorporated), formed in 1983 is the governing body in Australia for the sport of eight-ball pool, a cue sport also standardised under the name blackball, and distinct from the American-style game of eight-ball, itself subject to international competition.

Australia became a founding member in 1992 of the World Eightball Pool Federation.

The federation holds annual championships for team and individual for men's and ladies representation for Australia at the annual world championships.

Member organisations
Founding Members (1983):
 Northern Territory – Northern Territory Eightball Association
 Queensland – Queensland Eight Ball Federation
 South Australia – Eight-Ball Association of SA
 Tasmania – Eightball Tasmania
 Victoria – Pool Victoria
 Western Australia – West Australian Eightball Federation (Inc)

Later members:
 New South Wales (1987) – NSW 8 Ball Federation
 Australian Capital Territory (1990) – ACT Eight Ball Association (ACTEBA)

See also

Cue sports in Australia

References

External links

Pool organizations